Myrcia magnifolia is a species of plant in the family Myrtaceae. It is endemic to southeast Brazil. Under its synonym Gomidesia magnifolia, it was classed as endangered.

References

Flora of Brazil
magnifolia
Endangered plants
Taxonomy articles created by Polbot
Taxobox binomials not recognized by IUCN